INTERMAT Middle East is an annual international trade show for the construction and materials industries. It is currently held at the Abu Dhabi National Exhibition Centre (ADNEC) where the last show was held in October 2012. The next show is scheduled for January 14–16, 2014.

INTERMAT Middle East is an event showing the equipment and techniques used in the international building and civil engineering sectors to contractors and public authorities, all companies involved in building road, highway, railway, bridges, tunnels, ports and airports, marine and oil & gas infrastructures in the Middle East region.
This trade exhibition is organised by Clarion Events Middle East and Comexposium, the leading European trade show organiser.

Under the patronage of:
 Hamdan bin Zayed bin Sultan Al Nahyan, UAE Federal Minister of Public Works

2012 event 
 213 exhibitors
 5,523 visitors from 23 countries
 49 visiting countries
 8 national pavillons

Key information 
 Creation : 2011
 Frequency: Every year
 Next exhibition: January 14–16, 2014
 Opening times: 10.00 to 18.00
 Venue: Abu Dhabi National Exhibition Centre – Abu Dhabi - UAE
 Exhibition area: 20,000 sqm area dedicated to construction equipment, components and accessories for the civil engineering, building and materials industries
 Exhibitors: 250 exhibitors

References 

 INTERMAT Middle East Returns to Abu Dhabi in October 2012
 Under the patronage of His Highness Sheikh Hamdan Bin Mubarak Al Nahyan
 UAE ambassador hints at construction boom
 Doosan Infracore Construction Equipment welcomes important Middle East delegation at Intermat
 Global leaders from the construction industry confirmed to participate at Intermat Middle East 2012
 Global plant leaders sign up for INTERMAT ME 2012
 2012 likely 'record year' in ME for Liebherr
 Growing support for Intermat Middle East
 General Manager of SENNEBOGEN Middle East Predicts ‘Good Possibilities’ in the Future of the GCC Construction Industry
 Major equipment projects all in Saudi - Kanoo GM
 Post Show Report Intermat Middle East 2012

External links 
 INTERMAT Middle East

Events in Abu Dhabi
Trade fairs in the United Arab Emirates